The 1984 New York Jets season was the 25th season for the team and the fifteenth in the National Football League. It began with the team trying to improve upon its 7–9 record from 1983 under head coach Joe Walton. After playing the previous 20 seasons at Shea Stadium in Queens, 1984 marked their first season of playing its home games at Giants Stadium in The Meadowlands, which was also the home of the NFC’s New York Giants. Mark Gastineau made NFL history by recording 22 sacks, to establish a then-new official single season record. The Jets finished the season with a record of 7–9.

Roster

Regular season

Schedule 
{| class="wikitable" style="text-align:center"
|-
!style=""| Week
!style=""| Date
!style=""| Opponent
!style=""| Result
!style=""| Record
!style=""| Venue
!style=""| Attendance
|-style="background:#cfc"
! 1
| September 2
| at Indianapolis Colts
| W 23–14
| 1–0
| Hoosier Dome
| 61,148
|-style="background:#fcc"
! 2
| September 6
| Pittsburgh Steelers
| L 17–23
| 1–1
| Giants Stadium
| 70,564
|-style="background:#cfc"
! 3
| September 16
| Cincinnati Bengals
| W 43–23
| 2–1
| Giants Stadium
| 64,193
|-style="background:#cfc"
! 4
|September 23
| at Buffalo Bills
| W 28–26
| 3–1
| Rich Stadium
| 48,330
|-style="background:#fcc"
! 5
|September 30
| New England Patriots
| L 21–28
| 3–2
| Giants Stadium
| 68,978
|-style="background:#cfc"
! 6
| October 7
| at Kansas City Chiefs
| W 17–16
| 4–2
| Arrowhead Stadium
| 51,843
|-style="background:#cfc"
! 7
| October 14
| at Cleveland Browns
| W 24–20
| 5–2
| Cleveland Municipal Stadium
| 55,673
|-style="background:#cfc"
! 8
| October 21
| Kansas City Chiefs
| W 28–7
| 6–2
| Giants Stadium
| 66,782
|-style="background:#fcc"
! 9
| October 28
| at New England Patriots
| L 20–30
| 6–3
| Sullivan Stadium
| 60,513
|-style="background:#fcc"
! 10
| November 4
| Miami Dolphins| L 17–31
| 6–4
| Giants Stadium
| 72,655
|-style="background:#fcc"
! 11
| November 11
| Indianapolis Colts| L 5–9
| 6–5
| Giants Stadium
| 51,066
|-style="background:#fcc"
! 12
| November 18
| at Houston Oilers
| L 20–31
| 6–6
| Astrodome
| 40,141
|-style="background:#fcc"
! 13
| November 26
| at Miami Dolphins| L 17–28
| 6–7
| Miami Orange Bowl
| 74,884
|-style="background:#fcc"
! 14
| December 2
| New York Giants
| L 10–20
| 6–8
| Giants Stadium
| 74,975
|-style="background:#cfc"
! 15
| December 8
| Buffalo Bills| W 21–17
| 7–8
| Giants Stadium
| 45,378
|-style="background:#fcc"
! 16
| December 16
| at Tampa Bay Buccaneers
| L 21–41
| 7–9
| Tampa Stadium
| 43,817
|}

 Game summaries 

 Week 1 

    
    
    
    
    
    

 Week 3 

    
    
    
    
    
    
    
    
    
    
    
    
    

 Week 9 

 Source:''' Pro-Football-Reference.com
    
    
    
    
    
    
    
    
    
    

Raymond Berry's first game as Patriots' head coach.

Standings

References

External links 
 1984 statistics

New York Jets seasons
New York Jets
New York Jets season
20th century in East Rutherford, New Jersey
Meadowlands Sports Complex